Peggy Evans (10 January 1921 – 26 July 2015) was an English actress. She trained at the Rank Organisation's The Company of Youth (a "charm school").

Early years
One of four children, Evans was born in Sheffield but grew up in Ealing, west London. As a teenager, her winning a creative writing contest earned her a screen test with the Rank Organization.

Film
After having bit parts in Lightning Conductor (1938) and Charley's (Big-Hearted) Aunt (1940), Evans entered the Royal Academy of Dramatic Art for training. Her work in Penny and the Pownall Case (1948) was praised in Monthly Film Review: "Peggy Evans ... is a sparkling heroine, who not only looks extremely attractive but acts with naturalness and charm as well." On stage she appeared in the 1953 West End play Four Winds.

Personal life
Evans was married twice: to actor Michael Howard from 1949 to 1956; the union produced two children but ended in divorce. She married, secondly, to Peter Stevens in 1990; the couple remained together until his death in 1997. In later years, she learned Portuguese and lived in the Algarve for part of each year.

Death
On 26 July 2015, at age 94, Evans died in England. She was survived by a son and a daughter.

Filmography

References

External links
 

1921 births
2015 deaths
Actresses from Sheffield
English film actresses
People from Ealing
British expatriates in Portugal